Louis Matthew Bird (born 31 October 1990) is an English former professional footballer who played as a defender from 2008 to 2011.

He played in the Football League for Grimsby Town, as well as playing for Frickley Athletic and Boston United on loan.

Career

Grimsby Town
Bird came through the youth team Grimsby Town. He was invited to trial with Manchester United in January 2008 but this was cut short due to a recurring knee injury. Bird signed his first professional contract in March 2008, tying him to Grimsby Town until 2010, with youth team coach Neil Woods saying, "He's got great potential. He's 6ft 1in, left-footed, got good pace, and I think that it's the right move at this time for Matthew and for us." He made his first-team debut as a substitute in a 0–1 defeat to Rotherham United in April 2008. Bird played no part in the 2008–2009 season, failing to even make the subs bench under Alan Buckley and his replacement Mike Newell

After failing to make a single first team appearance in little under two years, Bird was loaned too Frickley Athletic on 5 November 2009. Bird returned to Blundell Park a month later on 5 December, but returned to Frickley again for a second spell on the 21st. Bird signed for Boston United on loan in March 2010. Whilst in his month loan spell with United, he helped them to promotion from the Unibond Premier League via the play-offs to ensure Boston United play football in the Conference North next season.

Non League
Bird was released by Grimsby Town on 12 May 2010. He re-joined Frickley Athletic ahead of the 2010–2011 season. In October 2010 he joined Goole. He left Goole in January 2011 after suffering an injury that had kept him on the sidelines since October.

Honours

Grimsby Town
Football League Trophy runner up: 2007–08

Boston United
Northern Premier League Premier Division play-off winners: 2009–10

Career statistics

References

External links

Matthew Bird profile, Grimsby Town FC official website

1990 births
Living people
Footballers from Grimsby
Association football defenders
English footballers
English Football League players
Grimsby Town F.C. players
Frickley Athletic F.C. players
Boston United F.C. players
Goole A.F.C. players